Hugh John Baiocchi (born 17 August 1946) is a South African professional golfer who has won more than 20 professional tournaments around the world.

Professional career 
Baiocchi was born in Johannesburg. He turned professional in 1971 and spent his regular career playing mainly in Europe. He was a member of the European Tour from its first season in 1972 until 1993 and made the top one hundred on the Order of Merit for the Tour's first nineteen seasons, including three top ten placings: 1973 (3rd); 1975 (6th) and 1977 (2nd). He won six official money events on the tour. He also competed regularly on the Southern Africa Tour during the Northern Hemisphere winter, winning several tournaments there and winning the Order of Merit in 1978/79.

As a senior (over 50) golfer, Baiocchi played mainly on the U.S.-based Champions Tour, where he has three wins. Married to wife Joan and with two children (Lauren and Justin), he lives in Tequesta, Florida.  His daughter, Lauren, was married to well-known retired baseball player Johnny Bench.

He also designed many golf courses such as the Legend Course at the Constance Belle Mare Plage Resort in Mauritius, venue of the 2011 MCB Tour Championship.

Amateur wins
1968 Brazil Amateur Open Championship
1970 South African Amateur

Professional wins (24)

European Tour wins (6)

European Tour playoff record (1–1)

Sunshine Tour wins (12)
1973 Western Province Open, General Motors International Classic, ICL Transvaal Open
1976 Holiday Inns Royal Swazi Sun Open, ICL International, Rhodesian Dunlop Masters
1979 South African Open
1980 Zimbabwe Open, South African PGA Championship
1981 Vaal Reefs Open
1989 Twee Jonge Gezellen Masters, SA Railfreight

Other wins (3)
1980 BCA Tournament
1989 Murphy's Cup
2002 Nelson Mandela Invitational (with Deane Pappas)

Senior PGA Tour wins (3)

*Note: The 1998 Korger Senior Classic was shortened to 36 holes due to rain.

Senior PGA Tour playoff record (2–2)

Results in major championships

Note: Baiocchi never played in the PGA Championship.

CUT = missed the half-way cut (3rd round cut in 1972, 1976, 1977, 1978, 1982 and 1983 Open Championships)
WD = Withdrew
"T" indicates a tie for a place

Summary

Most consecutive cuts made – 2 (four times)
Longest streak of top-10s – 1

Team appearances
Amateur
Commonwealth Tournament (representing South Africa): 1967
Eisenhower Trophy (representing South Africa): 1968, 1970

Professional
Double Diamond International (representing the Rest of the World): 1972, 1973, 1976, 1977 (captain)
World Cup (representing South Africa): 1973, 1977
Hennessy Cognac Cup (representing the Rest of the World): 1982

References

External links

South African male golfers
European Tour golfers
PGA Tour Champions golfers
Golfers from Johannesburg
Sportspeople from Palm Springs, California
South African people of Italian descent
1946 births
Living people